Britton's Neck is an unincorporated community in Marion County, South Carolina, United States.  Brittons Neck is located in the southern part of Marion County on SC 908 south of Centenary and north of US 378. One of the oldest settlements in Marion County, Britton's Neck lay between the Great and the Little Pee Dee Rivers extending northward from the mouth of the Little Pee Dee River. It was named for Francis, Timothy, Daniel, Moses, Joseph, and Philip Britton, who settled in the neck about 1735–1736. They were the sons of Francis Britton, who was in Carolina by 1697. Britton's Ferry sat on the Great Pee Dee River at the Junction of the Williamsburg, Georgetown, and Marion County lines. The ferry was established by Francis Britton and two other commissioners under an Act of 1747. Britton's Neck was the center of patriot sympathy during the American Revolution, making the ferry important to both sides. Brittons Neck Elementary School is located near the community.

References

External links

Unincorporated communities in Marion County, South Carolina
Unincorporated communities in South Carolina